Springfield, New Brunswick may refer to:

Springfield, Carleton County, New Brunswick
Springfield, Kings County, New Brunswick
Springfield, York County, New Brunswick
Springfield Parish, New Brunswick, a parish in Kings County